Clarence Shirley Woolmer (27 June 1910 in Lewisham, London, England – 10 February 1999) was a former English cricketer. He was captain of United Provinces (now Uttar Pradesh) during the Ranji Trophy in 1948–1949 against Bombay State (Maharashtra).

His son Bob Woolmer (born in Kanpur) was a cricketer for England as well as a coach of South Africa and Pakistan. When Bob was born, Clarence placed bat and ball in Bob's cot hoping that he would eventually become a cricketer.

References

See also
 Bio on CricInfo
 Cricket Archive
 Article on Bob Woolmer

1910 births
1999 deaths
English cricketers
Uttar Pradesh cricketers